Alex Anthony (born April 9, 1991) is a professional Canadian football receiver who is currently a free agent. Anthony spent the first two seasons of his career playing with the Saskatchewan Roughriders of the Canadian Football League. Anthony was drafted in the fifth round of the 2013 CFL Draft by the Saskatchewan Roughriders. Anthony played CIS Football with the Wilfrid Laurier Golden Hawks.

College career
Anthony played football for the Wilfrid Laurier Golden Hawks. He finished his career with 47 receptions for 722 yards and seven touchdowns.

Professional career

Saskatchewan Roughriders
Anthony was drafted by the Saskatchewan Roughriders with the 39th pick in the 2013 CFL Draft. In 2013, Anthony won the 101st Grey Cup with the Roughriders. Anthony spent much of the 2014 season on the practice roster before being released in June 2015.

References

External links
Saskatchewan Roughriders bio 

1991 births
Living people
Players of Canadian football from British Columbia
Saskatchewan Roughriders players
Sportspeople from Victoria, British Columbia
Wilfrid Laurier Golden Hawks football players